Katharina of Schwarzburg-Blankenburg (after 1470 – 27 November 1514) was the wife of Count Reinhard IV of Hanau-Münzenberg (14 March 1473 – 30 January 1512).

She was a daughter of Günther XXXVIII of Schwarzburg-Blankenburg (1450-1484) and Catherine of Querfurt (d. 1521).

Katharina and Reinhard married on 13 February 1496.  As her dowry, she brought 4000 guilders into the marriage, plus the share held by Schwarzburg in the mortgage on the imperial city of Gelnhausen.  With this share, the count acquired a power base in the Kinzig valley, which connected "Upper Hanau", around Schlüchtern and Steinau an der Straße and "Lower Hanau" around the city of Hanau.

Katharina died on 27 November 1514 and was buried in the Church of St. Mary in Hanau.  A picture of her can be found on the side of a seat in the choir of the church, opposite a picture of her husband.

Issue 
Reinhard and Katharina had four children:
 Anna (born: 22 May 1498; died in the same year)
 Berthold (born: 12 July 1499; died: 27 April 1504), buried in the choir of St. Mary's Church in Hanau
 Philipp II (1501–1529)
 Balthasar (1508–1534)

References 
 Reinhard Dietrich: Die Landesverfassung in dem Hanauischen, in the series Hanauer Geschichtsblätter, vol. 34, Hanau, 1996, 
 Reinhard Dietrich and Simone Heider-Geiß: Die evangelische Marienkirche Hanau, Kassel, 2001, 
 Fried Lübecke: Hanau. Stadt und Grafschaft, Cologne, 1951
 Reinhard Suchier: Genealogie des Hanauer Grafenhauses, in: Festschrift des Hanauer Geschichtsvereins zu seiner fünfzigjährigen Jubelfeier am 27. August 1894, Hanau, 1894
 Ernst J. Zimmermann: Hanau Stadt und Land, 3rd ed., Hanau, 1919, reprinted 1978

House of Hanau
House of Schwarzburg
15th-century births
1514 deaths
15th-century German people
16th-century German women